is a private university in Niigata, Japan. It was established in 2001.

External links
 Official website 
 website (English version)

Educational institutions established in 2001
Private universities and colleges in Japan
Niigata (city)
Universities and colleges in Niigata Prefecture
2001 establishments in Japan